Uncharacterized protein C9orf78 is a protein that in humans is encoded by the C9orf78 gene.

References

External links

Further reading